{
  "type": "FeatureCollection",
  "features": [
    {
      "type": "Feature",
      "properties": {"fill": "#ff0000","fill-opacity": 0.3,"stroke-width": 0},
      "geometry": {
        "type": "Polygon",
        "coordinates": [
          [
            [
              126.87149047851564,
              36.0779620797358
            ],
            [
              126.83441162109376,
              36.0857311106239
            ],
            [
              126.83166503906251,
              36.116799556445024
            ],
            [
              126.79046630859376,
              36.13898378070337
            ],
            [
              126.79733276367189,
              36.17557404062257
            ],
            [
              126.71218872070314,
              36.17779108329074
            ],
            [
              126.69296264648439,
              36.20106624342554
            ],
            [
              126.73004150390626,
              36.230981283477924
            ],
            [
              126.73141479492189,
              36.255348043040904
            ],
            [
              126.69845581054689,
              36.274171699242515
            ],
            [
              126.68060302734376,
              36.31623169903713
            ],
            [
              126.69845581054689,
              36.3693276982337
            ],
            [
              126.73416137695314,
              36.38591277287654
            ],
            [
              126.80969238281251,
              36.361586786517776
            ],
            [
              126.84814453125001,
              36.38701831877111
            ],
            [
              126.86050415039064,
              36.326189956186084
            ],
            [
              126.91131591796876,
              36.32176422120382
            ],
            [
              126.92367553710939,
              36.30848550829368
            ],
            [
              126.97723388671876,
              36.33504067209607
            ],
            [
              126.99783325195314,
              36.32176422120382
            ],
            [
              126.99920654296876,
              36.29077703961915
            ],
            [
              127.07199096679689,
              36.27306455094139
            ],
            [
              127.07336425781251,
              36.25424062786422
            ],
            [
              127.03765869140626,
              36.22876574685929
            ],
            [
              127.02529907226564,
              36.20217441183449
            ],
            [
              126.99783325195314,
              36.1955251660701
            ],
            [
              126.99645996093751,
              36.18000806322456
            ],
            [
              127.01019287109376,
              36.15007354140755
            ],
            [
              126.98822021484376,
              36.14563782526007
            ],
            [
              126.95800781250001,
              36.15672664526235
            ],
            [
              126.92230224609376,
              36.144528857027765
            ],
            [
              126.89620971679689,
              36.14563782526007
            ],
            [
              126.87561035156251,
              36.12234620030518
            ],
            [
              126.87011718750001,
              36.097938036628065
            ],
            [
              126.87149047851564,
              36.0779620797358
            ]
          ]
        ]
      }
    }
  ]
}Sabi was the third and final capital of the Korean kingdom of Baekje (KOR: 백제, also translated as Paekche), from 538 until Baekje’s fall in 660 CE. The site of Sabi is located in modern-day Buyeo County, South Chungcheong Province, in South Korea.

Sabi Fortress also is known by the names Busosanseong, Sabiseong or Soburiseong Fortress. It consists of the inner fortress divided by roads centered on the royal palace, a defensive fortress called "Buso Mountain Fortress", and outer walls surrounding the palace. The inner part of the fortress involves 5 district area, where the existence of district was verified through rocks, roof titles, and wooden tablets etched with the name of administrative areas. It is also assumed that the royal palace of Baekje had been located on this site.

Location 
The location of Sabi is north of current downtown Buyeo at the southern foot of Busosan Mountain. This location was chosen for its natural fortifications and ease of access to other regions. It was located on a plain on the Geum River, which served as a point of outreach to the southern portion of the Korean peninsula, as well as the Gaya Region. It was located at the foot of mountains, which helped shield it from attacks, though it was surrounded by extensive agricultural lands. The Yellow Sea was nearby as well, which allowed for easy trade with China and Japan.

History 
Sabi was the third and final capital of Baekje. The previous capital, Ungjin (KOR: 웅진), was isolated in the mountains, cutting it off from the outside world, making it an unfit location for the capital. King Song, the king of the kingdom of Baekje, moved the capital approximately 30 kilometers southwest to Sabi instead in 538 CE. Sabi was the capital of the kingdom of Baekje for 120 years until 660 CE, when Baekje fell to an attack from the neighboring kingdom of Silla, combined with forces from Tang Dynasty China. The city officially surrendered on August 24, 660.

During the 120 years, Sabi was under the control of:

 King Song (523-554)
 King Widok (554-598)
 King Hye (598-599)
 King Pop (599-600)
 King Mu (600-641)
 King Uija (641-660)

King Mu attempted to move the capital to Iksan (KOR: 익산) during his reign, but it wasn’t successful.

Sabi Conference(泗沘會議) were held in 541 and 544. See also Anra Conference(安羅會議) in 529

In 541, 1st Sabi Conference be held, Baekje(百濟), Anra(安羅), Daegaya(加羅), Zolma(卒麻), Sanbanhae(散半奚), Dara(多羅), Sagi(斯二岐), Jata(子他), and Anra-wa envoy office(Korean: 안라왜신관, Hanja: 安羅倭臣官) gather.
At this meeting, Gaya asked Baekje if they could defend against Silla's attacks. Then, Baekje said Takgitan, Taksun, and Geumgwan Gaya were all ruined by weakness own and promised to defend themselves.
In fact, Baekje could not make a strong promise because Baekje needed Silla's help to regain the Han River basin.
In July, Anra felt uneasy and contacted Silla through the Anra-wa envoy office(安羅日本府). After noticing this, Baekje(King Seong) called Imna and scolded.
Then, emphasizes the history of King Geunchogo's reign and promise that the three countries that have been destroyed will be restored and returned to the Gaya.
In July 542, Beakje declared Gaya Confederacy revival, but this was a just none-action declaration.
Anra, who has a resistance, is engaged in diplomacy.
In November 543, the Japan declared that it would send out Baekje's generals and castellan within the Imna and Gaya Confederacy through the Anra-wa envoy office(安羅倭臣官).
In December 543, King Seong held a Jeongsa Rock Council(Korean: 정사암회의, Hanja: 政事巖會議) to resolve Gaya's rebellion, and the conclusion was to hold 2nd Sabi Conference.
Baekje convened a Conference in December 543, but the Gaya Confederacy continued to make excuses, and Baekje, which was angry in February 544, called in the "Anra-wa envoy office" official to insult and send him back to the Japanese state.
The Japan announced that it was willing to participate in the Sabi conference, but the Gaya Confederacy did not continue to attend in March.
Eventually, in October 544, the envoy of Baekje returned from Japan and promised to grant Gaya the request as much as possible.

In 544 November, 2nd Sabi Conference be held, and eight countries, including Baekje and the Gucha(久嵯國) gather.
In order to protect the Gaya Confederacy, King Seong of Baekje said at the meeting, "We will build six castles on the Nakdong River, the border area between Silla and Anra, and instead of stationed 3,000 Japanese soldiers and Baekje troops, Baekje will pay for it."
"The reason why Baekje cannot send out its generals and castellan is not to prevent exchanges between Gaya and Japan. In preparation for the attack of Goguryeo and Silla, it is inevitable to send them out.' made an excuse.
It also calls for all the Gaya Japanese in the "Anra-wa envoy office(安羅倭臣官)" to be sent to Japan. The Gaya Confederacy disband after saying it think deeply about the proposal.
In March and May of 545, Japan and Baekje exchanged envoys. They exchanged again in January, June and July 546. In April 547 Baekje requested Silla, Gaya, and japan to serve as soldiers.
In January 548, the Goguryeo-Ye Alliance attacked, but Silla supported 3,000 soldiers and eventually managed to stop them. called Battle of Mt.Doksseong Castle(Korean: 독성산성전투, Hanja: 禿城山城戰鬪)(548).
However, after Baekje fought with Goguryeo, they took prisoners and questioned them, and they said, "Anra and wa envoy office(倭臣官) recommended the conquest of Baekje to Goguryeo.' gets information.
Baekje sent envoys to Anra three times to confirm the facts, but all of them were rejected. In April 548 Baekje sent envoys to the Japanese government to interrogate them. The Japanese government did not know about it, but Baekje did not believe it and canceled its military request.
King Seong led the armies of Silla and Imna as well as the Baekje army, starting the Han River Restoration War(Korean: 한강 수복전, Hanja: 漢江收復戰)(551~553). Through this, Baekje recovers the Han River but is betrayed by Silla in Battle of Gwansan Castle(Korean: 관산성전투, Hanja: 管山城 戰鬪)(554). Then, it ends with Fall of Gaya(562)

Features 
The city was surrounded by a two-layered defense. The outer layer was the Busosan Fortress, that guarded the capital from the side that the nearby mountains left open. The inner layer was The Naseong (KOR: 나성) City Wall which encircled the entire capital. The original appearance of both layers are still intact.

The city was divided into 5 administrative districts called bu (KOR: 부), those were divided into 5 smaller districts called hang (KOR: 항).

The royal palace and its surrounding facilities were located directly at the southern foot of Busosan Mountain. There was a man made pond located south of the palace. It was completed in 634, under the orders of King Mu.

Excavation since the 1980s has uncovered the building site of the royal palace, including water supply facilities, storage facilities, a lotus pond. The site of the Jeongnimsa (KOR: 정림사) Temple, which was built in the center of the city, was also discovered, as well as royal tombs just outside the eastern part of the Naseong City Wall. These archeological sites were added to UNESCO World Heritage List in 2015.

Royal Palace 
The royal palace and its surrounding facilities are located at the northernmost end of the city. There, a large building site was discovered. The site spans 35m across and 18.5m in length, which is evident from the 50cm tall remains of the platform that once supported the building. Within the site 36 rammed-earth foundations were discovered, which are believed to have supported the pillars and cornerstones of the building.

The site was confirmed to be the royal palace due to three different types of evidence. The first being a gilt-bronze waist belt was found at the site. The belt could have only belonged to a king due to the strict hierarchy of Baekje society at the time. This discovery indicated that the area was once the residence of a king. Roof tiles with inscriptions of the royal court, large stone structures, and a monument to Liu Renyuan of Tang China, were found at the site. These point to the importance of the location, which point to it being the location of the royal palace. The site was also used for local government offices in later Korean dynasties.

Two large, wooden water tanks, five underground, wooden storage facilities, three stone storage facilities, and various other storage pits were also found at the location. A man-made lotus pond that was 10.6m in width, 6.2m in length, and ranged from 1 to 1.2m in depth, was found as well.

Busosan Fortress 
The fortress was built to protect the city from the sides that weren’t naturally protected by the surrounding mountains and river. It was built using a rammed-earth technique and had a perimeter of 2,495m, was 5 to 6m wide at the base, and was 3m high. Building sites, including a barracks for Baekje soldiers, as well as Gate Sites have been found within the fortress. Two Gate Sites have been identified, the first, which was the main gate, was on the south side of the fortress, while the second one was on the east side.

Jeongnimsa Temple 
The temple was located at the center of Sabi and is still located at the center of modern-day Buyeo. The temple included a central gate, a prayer hall, a lecture hall, and monks’ dormitories that were connected to the main buildings by linking corridors. The layout is believed to either have been “one pagoda and one prayer hall” or “one pagoda and two prayer halls.”

The only thing still remaining of the temple is an 8.3m tall stone pagoda. The pagoda has Chinese characters carved into the surface of it. The writing is celebrating the Tang Dynasty’s victory over the Kingdom of Baekje and was put there by the commanding Tang general, Liu Renyuan.

Royal Tombs 

Outside the eastern part of the city wall, 7 tombs are located. The tombs are within mounds of hollowed earth and can be seen as semi-spheres on the hillside. They are arranged in two rows of three mounds, while one mound is located 50m to the north.

The tombs are classified as stone chambers with a corridor and are divided into types based on what type of ceiling they have. The royal tombs of Sabi have three different types present: vault ceiling, hexagonal flat ceiling, and square flat ceiling.

References

See also 
 History of Korea
 Three Kingdoms of Korea
 Wiryeseong
 Ungjin
 Baekje Cultural Land

Baekje
Buildings and structures in South Chungcheong Province
Ancient Korean cities
Former capitals of Korea
Historic Sites of South Korea